Richard Dawkins: How a Scientist Changed the Way We Think is a festschrift of 25 essays written in recognition of the life and work of Richard Dawkins. It was published in 2006, to coincide with the 30th anniversary of the publication of The Selfish Gene. A wide range of topics is covered from many fields including evolutionary biology, philosophy, and psychology. Space is also given to writers who are not in full agreement with Dawkins. The book is edited by two of Dawkins' former PhD students, Alan Grafen and Mark Ridley.

Reception
The reviews of the book have been mixed, but the controversial title phrase, "How a Scientist Changed the Way We Think" has been explained by considering Dawkins to have worked as an influential educator and concise author, of The Selfish Gene, who promoted the key ideas of others about evolutionary biology, also including some controversial ideas which are not as widely accepted.
As the author of a popular science book, Dawkins had popularized ideas by George Williams about group selection, William Hamilton on the theory of kin selection in evolution, biologist/geneticist John Maynard Smith on evolutionarily stable strategies, and Robert Trivers about reciprocal altruism and competition between siblings versus parent and child.

Contributions
Biology
Andrew F. Read – Ballooning Parrots and Semi-Lunar Germs
Helena Cronin – The Battle of the Sexes Revisited
John Krebs – Richard Dawkins: Intellectual Plumber—and More
Michael Hansell – What is a Puma?
The Selfish Gene
Marian Stamp Dawkins – Living with The Selfish Gene
David Haig – The Gene Meme
Alan Grafen – The Intellectual Contribution of The Selfish Gene to Evolutionary Theory
Ullica Segerstråle – An Eye on the Core: Dawkins and Sociobiology
Logic
Daniel C. Dennett – The Selfish Gene as a Philosophical Essay
Seth Bullock – The Invention of an Algorithmic Biology
David Deutsch – Selfish Genes and Information Flow
Steven Pinker – Deep Commonalities between Life and Mind
Antiphonal voices
Michael Ruse – Richard Dawkins and the Problem of Progress
Patrick Bateson – The Nest's Tale: Affectionate Disagreements with Richard Dawkins
Robert Aunger – What's the Matter with Memes?
Humans
Martin Daly & Margo Wilson – Selfish Genes and Family Relations
Randolph M. Nesse – Why a Lot of People with Selfish Genes Are Pretty Nice Except for their Hatred of The Selfish Gene
Kim Sterelny – The Perverse Primate
Controversy
Michael Shermer – The Skeptic's Chaplain: Richard Dawkins as a Fountainhead of Skepticism
Richard Harries – A Fellow Humanist
A. C. Grayling – Dawkins and the Virus of Faith
Marek Kohn – To Rise Above
David P. Barash – What the Whale Wondered: Evolution, Existentialism, and the Search for "Meaning"
Writing
Matt Ridley – Richard Dawkins and the Golden Pen
Philip Pullman – Every Indication of Inadvertent Solicitude

References

2006 non-fiction books
Cognitive science literature
Science studies
Richard Dawkins
Festschrifts
Oxford University Press books